Snota is a prominent mountain in the Trollheimen mountain range in the municipality of Surnadal in Møre og Romsdal county, Norway.  It is also the highest mountain in the municipality of Surnadal.  It lies west of the mountain Trollhetta and north of the mountain Neådalssnota.

The peak is accessible from a parking lot by the lake Gråsjøen, from the cabin Trollheimshytta (owned by the Norwegian Mountain Touring Association), and also from Vindøldalen/Vassdalen valley to the west (though less common).

The first winter ascent was in 1997. Below the wall is the small Snota glacier.

References

External links

Mountains of Møre og Romsdal
Surnadal